Gmina Rossosz is a rural gmina (administrative district) in Biała Podlaska County, Lublin Voivodeship, in eastern Poland.

Villages
Gmina Rossosz contains the villages and settlements of Bordziłówka, Kożanówka, Mokre, Musiejówka, Romaszki and Rossosz.

Neighbouring gminas
Gmina Rossosz is bordered by the gminas of Komarówka Podlaska, Łomazy and Wisznice.

References

External links
Polish official population figures 2006

Gminas in Lublin Voivodeship
Biała Podlaska County